Mexico competed at the 2017 World Championships in Athletics in London, United Kingdom, from 4–13 August 2017.

Medalists
The following competitors from Lithuania won medals at the Championships.

Results

Men
Track and road events

Field events

Women
Track and road events

Field events

References

Nations at the 2017 World Championships in Athletics
World Championships in Athletics
Mexico at the World Championships in Athletics